The 1957 Miami Redskins football team was an American football team that represented Miami University in the Mid-American Conference (MAC) during the 1957 NCAA University Division football season. In its second season under head coach John Pont, Miami compiled a 6–3 record (5–0 against MAC opponents), won the MAC championship, and outscored all opponents by a combined total of 163 to 137.

Mack Yoho was the team captain.  The team's statistical leaders included Dave Thelen with 755 rushing yards, Ernie Jarvis with 197 passing yards and Harold Williams with 118 receiving yards.

Schedule

References

Miami
Miami RedHawks football seasons
Mid-American Conference football champion seasons
Miami Redskins football